Warren Smith may refer to:

Music
 Warren Smith (jazz trombonist) (1908–1975), American trombonist
 Warren Smith (jazz percussionist) (born 1934), American jazz percussionist
 Warren Smith (singer) (1932–1980), American rockabilly singer

Sports
 Warren Smith (guard) (1896–1965), American football player
 Warren Smith (quarterback) (born 1990), American football quarterback
 Warren Smith (cricketer) (born 1941), Australian cricketer
 Warren Smith (golfer) (1915–2015), golf professional, Cherry Hills Country Club
 Warren Cummings Smith (born 1992), American-Estonian alpine skier
 Warren Smith (broadcaster), Australian television sports announcer with Fox Sports News Australia
 Warren W. Smith, American football player and coach

Other
 Warren Allen Smith (1921–2017), American gay activist
 Clip Smith (Warren Smith, 1941–2004), American radio and television announcer
 Warren Smith (author) (1931–2003), paranormal writer
 Warren J. Smith (1922–2008), president of the Optical Society of America, 1980
 Warren R. Smith (1889–1957), American politician